Ughli (also Romanized as Ūghlī; also known as Eroqlī, Evlī, Oghlū, Ovli, and Ovly) is a village in Aji Chay Rural District, in the Central District of Tabriz County, East Azerbaijan Province, Iran. At the 2006 census, its population was 738, in 199 families.

References 

Populated places in Tabriz County